There are over 20,000 Grade II* listed buildings in England. This page is a list of these buildings in the district of Rugby (borough) in Warwickshire.

Rugby

|}

Notes

External links

Lists of listed buildings in Warwickshire
 
Borough of Rugby